Bartholomew Parapolo (born 1963) is a politician of the Solomon Islands who serves as the Minister of Tourism and Culture.  He previously held the position of Minister of Forestry & Research from 18 August, 2015 to 27 October, 2015. In 2016 he was elected as the Paramount Chief of the Nggela Islands.

References

Solomon Islands politicians
1963 births
Living people
Forestry ministers of the Solomon Islands
Tourism ministers of the Solomon Islands
Culture ministers of the Solomon Islands